Prema Thapassu is a 1991 Telugu-language romantic drama film, produced by Sri Sai Madhavi Productions and directed by Dr. N. Siva Prasad. The film stars Rajendra Prasad and Roja, with music composed by Rajendra Prasad. The film is the debut of actress Roja in the film industry.

Cast
Rajendra Prasad as Rathaiah 
Roja as Mutyalu
Pokuri Baba Rao as Sivangi
Saikumar as Sagar
Brahmanandam
Suthi Velu
Narra Venkateswara Rao
Vennira Aadai Moorthy
Hema Sundar as Tata
Raj Varma as Kolaiappa
Prasanna Kumar
Devaki as Sujatha
Y. Vijaya

Soundtrack

Music composed by Rajendra Prasad. Music released by SURYA Music Company.

References

1990s Telugu-language films
Indian romantic drama films
1991 romantic drama films
1991 films